William Ernest Smith (9 March 1881 – 25 May 1945) was a New Zealand rugby union player. He was educated at Nelson College where he was a member of the 1st XV in 1897. A first five-eighth, Smith represented Nelson at a provincial level, and played only one match for the national side, the All Blacks, in 1905, an international against Australia in Dunedin.

Smith served in the Canterbury Infantry Battalion in World War I and was wounded at Gallipoli. He died in Wellington in 1945 and was buried in the soldiers' section of Karori Cemetery.

References

1881 births
1945 deaths
People educated at Nelson College
New Zealand rugby union players
New Zealand international rugby union players
New Zealand military personnel of World War I
Burials at Karori Cemetery
Rugby union players from Wellington City
Rugby union fly-halves
Nelson rugby union players